Ratna Kumar (born 2 February 1975) is a Sri Lankan sprinter. He competed in the men's 4 × 400 metres relay at the 2000 Summer Olympics.

References

External links
 

1975 births
Living people
Athletes (track and field) at the 2000 Summer Olympics
Sri Lankan male sprinters
Olympic athletes of Sri Lanka
Place of birth missing (living people)
Athletes (track and field) at the 1998 Asian Games
Asian Games competitors for Sri Lanka
20th-century Sri Lankan people
21st-century Sri Lankan people